The Harpun Rocks are submerged rocks lying  southeast of Bills Point, Delta Island, in the Melchior Islands of the Palmer Archipelago, Antarctica. The name appears on a chart based upon a 1927 survey by Discovery Investigations personnel, but may reflect an earlier naming by whalers. Harpun is a Norwegian form of the word harpoon.

References

Rock formations of the Palmer Archipelago